The following is a list of South-West Indian Ocean tropical cyclones between the year 1900 and 1950.

Storms

1904 Comoros cyclone
On December 14, a cyclone moved through the Comoros, causing damage to the island's vanilla and coffee plantations. Crop production declined by 9% as a result of the storm, causing food shortages after little rainfall in 1905.

1905 Comoros cyclone
On December 16, 1905, another cyclone moved struck the island group just a year after previous cyclone, killing 30 people and injuring 150. Responding to the two cyclones, the French government provided Fr.360,000 to the island group toward rebuilding and assistance for residents.

March 1927 cyclone
Considered the strongest to strike Madagascar for at least 67 years, a cyclone hit the eastern portion of the country on March 3, potentially causing as many as 500 deaths.

Cyclone of 1948
On January 22, a tropical disturbance formed northeast of Mauritius. Initially it moved to the southwest, but turned to the south on January 26. The next day, the storm passed just west of Réunion with winds estimated at around 300 km/h (187 mph), and later dissipated on January 28. The storm killed about 100 people and injured hundreds. About 60% of the island's houses were damaged or destroyed, and about 70% of the crops were destroyed.

See also

South-West Indian Ocean tropical cyclone
1900–1940 South Pacific cyclone seasons

1900s
Atlantic hurricane seasons: 1900, 1901, 1902, 1903, 1904, 1905, 1906, 1907, 1908, 1909
Eastern Pacific hurricane seasons: 1900, 1901, 1902, 1903, 1904, 1905, 1906, 1907, 1908, 1909
Western Pacific typhoon seasons: 1900, 1901, 1902, 1903, 1904, 1905, 1906, 1907, 1908, 1909
North Indian Ocean cyclone seasons: 1900, 1901, 1902, 1903, 1904, 1905, 1906, 1907, 1908, 1909

1910s
Atlantic hurricane seasons: 1910, 1911, 1912, 1913, 1914, 1915, 1916, 1917, 1918, 1919
Eastern Pacific hurricane seasons: 1910, 1911, 1912, 1913, 1914, 1915, 1916, 1917, 1918, 1919
Western Pacific typhoon seasons: 1910, 1911, 1912, 1913, 1934, 1915, 1916, 1917, 1918, 1919
North Indian Ocean cyclone seasons: 1910, 1911, 1912, 1913, 1914, 1915, 1916, 1917, 1918, 1919

1920s
Atlantic hurricane seasons: 1920, 1921, 1922, 1923, 1924, 1925, 1926, 1927, 1928, 1929
Eastern Pacific hurricane seasons: 1920, 1921, 1922, 1923, 1924, 1925, 1926, 1927, 1928, 1929
Western Pacific typhoon seasons: 1920, 1921, 1922, 1923, 1924, 1925, 1926, 1927, 1928, 1929
North Indian Ocean cyclone seasons: 1920, 1921, 1922, 1923, 1924, 1925, 1926, 1927, 1928, 1929

1930s
Atlantic hurricane seasons: 1930, 1931, 1932, 1933, 1934, 1935, 1936, 1937, 1938, 1939
Eastern Pacific hurricane seasons: 1930, 1931, 1932, 1933, 1934, 1935, 1936, 1937, 1938, 1939
Western Pacific typhoon seasons: 1930, 1931, 1932, 1933, 1934, 1935, 1936, 1937, 1938, 1939
North Indian Ocean cyclone seasons: 1930, 1931, 1932, 1933, 1934, 1935, 1936, 1937, 1928, 1939

1940s
Atlantic hurricane seasons: 1940, 1941, 1942, 1943, 1944, 1945, 1946, 1947, 1948, 1949
Eastern Pacific hurricane seasons: 1940, 1941, 1942, 1943, 1944, 1945, 1946, 1947, 1948, 1949
Western Pacific typhoon seasons: 1940, 1941, 1942, 1943, 1944, 1945, 1946, 1947, 1948, 1949
North Indian Ocean cyclone seasons: 1940, 1941, 1942, 1943, 1944, 1945, 1946, 1947, 1948, 1949

References

0000
Lists of tropical cyclones